Air Chief Marshal Sir David John Pryer Lee,  (4 September 1912 – 13 February 2004) was a Royal Air Force officer during the Second World War and a senior commander in the 1950s and early 1960s.

RAF career
Educated at Bedford School, Lee joined the Royal Air Force in 1930. He served in the Second World War as a pilot with No. 61 Squadron and then with No. 106 Squadron before becoming Deputy Director of Plans at the Air Ministry. He completed his war service as Officer Commanding No. 904 Wing in the Dutch East Indies where he was responsible for repatriating prisoners of war.

After the War he joined the Directing Staff at the RAF Staff College, Bracknell, and was then was appointed Deputy Director, Policy at the Air Ministry before becoming Station Commander at RAF Scampton in 1953. He went on to be Secretary of the Chiefs of Staff Committee in 1956, Air Officer Commanding Air Forces Middle East in 1959 and Commandant of the RAF Staff College, Bracknell in 1962. He last appointments were as Air Member for Personnel in 1965 and UK Military Representative to NATO in 1968 before retiring in 1971.

Family
In 1938 he married Denise Hartoch; they had a son and a daughter.

Books
Lee wrote three official histories of the RAF overseas:
Flight from the Middle East: A history of the Royal Air Force in the Arabian Peninsula and adjacent territories 1945–1972, HMSO 1980
Eastward: A history of the Royal Air Force in the Far East 1945–1972, HMSO 1984
Wings in the Sun: A history of the Royal Air Force in the Mediterranean 1945–1986, HMSO Books 1989

He also wrote two accounts of his own time in the RAF:
Never Stop the Engine when it's Hot, Thomas Harmsworth Publishing 1983 – recounting his time as a junior officer flying Westland Wapitis between the wars on the NorthWest Frontier of India
...And We Thought the War Was Over, Thomas Harmsworth Publishing 1991 – about his time as CO of 904 Tactical Wing of P-47 Thunderbolts in the Dutch East Indies at the end of World War II

References

|-

|-

1912 births
2004 deaths
People educated at Bedford School
British World War II pilots
British World War II bomber pilots
Royal Air Force air marshals
Knights Grand Cross of the Order of the British Empire
Companions of the Order of the Bath
People from Luton
Military personnel from Bedfordshire